Scopula melanopis is a moth of the family Geometridae. It is found in Rwanda.

References

Moths described in 1929
melanopis
Moths of Africa